Nisha Adhikari is a Nepali film actress and model.

Adhikari made her acting debut in a comedy programme called Gharbeti Ba on Kantipur Television. Her debut movie was Mission Paisa (2009) starring Nikhil Upreti, which was one of the most successful movies of its release year in Nepal. In 2010, she appeared in the films Nainraresham and First Love. First Love broke all the records the year It released, with demands to rerun the film in the theatres.

Filmography

Television series

Films

Music videos

Personal life
She is married to Nepalese cricketer Sharad Vesawkar.

References

External links

Profile: eNasha
Profile on CyberSansar

Nepalese female models
Year of birth missing (living people)
Miss Nepal winners
Nepalese beauty pageant winners
Living people
Nepalese film actresses
Actresses in Nepali cinema
21st-century Nepalese actresses
Nepalese summiters of Mount Everest
Nepalese television actresses
Actresses in Nepali television
Actors from Kathmandu